The foxglove aphid, (Aulacorthum solani), also known as glasshouse-potato aphid, is an aphid in the superfamily Aphidoidea in the order Hemiptera. It is a true bug and sucks sap from plants.

Host
It has one of the broadest host ranges of any aphid in the world, where they both hosts on dicots and monocots.

Economic importance
It is known to be a major insect pest on tomato, peppers, tobacco, celery, carrots, tulip bulbs, cucurbits and legumes.

References

External links
 http://influentialpoints.com/Gallery/Aulacorthum_solani_Glasshouse-potato_aphid_Foxglove_aphid.htm

Macrosiphini
Agricultural pest insects